Borough Park may refer to:
Borough Park, Brooklyn, United States
Borough Park (Workington), a football stadium in Workington, England
Borough Park, Tamworth, a small residential area of Tamworth, Staffordshire, England
Borough Park, Blackpool, a rugby league ground